Taeniotes simplex is a species of beetle in the family Cerambycidae. It was described by Charles Joseph Gahan in 1888. It is known from the Galápagos Islands and Costa Rica.

References

simplex
Beetles described in 1888